Burkhard Gladigow (8 November 1939 – 16 December 2022) was a German scholar of religious studies and classical philology. He was professor at the University of Tübingen.

Biography
Burkhard Gladigow was born in Berlin on 8 November 1939. Gladigow studied classical philology, philosophy and religious studies at the Free University of Berlin. He received his PhD from the University of Tübingen in 1962 with a dissertation on the concepts of sophos and sophia from Homer to Aeschylus. He later became professor of general religious studies and classical philology at the University of Tübingen. His research focused on systematic religious studies, ancient, European and Mediterranean history of religion, the history of science, and the interference of natural science and religion. His contributions to the study of polytheism include the identification of three interdependent aspects in all major debates on the subject since the Renaissance: artistic genius as a compensation for the disenchantment of nature, the idea of polytheism as closer to nature than monotheism, and polytheism as an alternative to the claim of absolute truth.

Gladigow died on 16 December 2022 at the age of 83.

References

1939 births
2022 deaths
Academic staff of the University of Tübingen
Religious studies scholars
German classical philologists
People from Berlin